Allemans is a commune in the Dordogne department in Nouvelle-Aquitaine in southwestern France.

Geography
The river Sauvanie forms the commune's northern border, then flows into the Lizonne, which forms the commune's north-western border; then the Lizonne flows into the Dronne, which forms the commune's south-western and southern borders.

Population

See also
Communes of the Dordogne département

References

Communes of Dordogne